North Conway is a census-designated place (CDP) and village in eastern Carroll County, New Hampshire, United States. The population was 2,116 at the 2020 census. A year-round resort area, North Conway is the second-largest village within the town of Conway, after the village of Conway proper. North Conway maintains its own fire station, post office and public library, sharing its other services with Conway. The White Mountain National Forest is to the west and north. The area is home to Cathedral Ledge (popular with climbers), Echo Lake State Park, and Cranmore Mountain Resort. North Conway is known for its large number of outlet shops.

History 

Chartered in 1765 by colonial Governor Benning Wentworth, the town is named for Henry Seymour Conway, ambitious son of a prominent English family, who was elected to the House of Commons at age 20, fought at Culloden, and became Secretary of State. Early settlers called the area Pequawket (known colloquially as "Pigwacket"), adopting the name of the Abenaki Indian village which stretched down the Saco River to its stockaded center at Fryeburg, Maine.

North Conway is in the White Mountains, with Mount Washington to the northwest. The rugged terrain became popular in the 19th century with artists. Their paintings were known collectively as White Mountain art, which in turn attracted tourists to the area, particularly after the Portsmouth, Great Falls & Conway Railroad extended service in 1872 to North Conway. In 1874, the line built a Second Empire depot, designed by Nathaniel J. Bradlee. In 1932, "snow trains" began carrying enthusiasts to "the birthplace of American skiing", as North Conway is known.

Increasing automobile travel brought the decline of trains. The railroad, then part of the Boston & Maine, abandoned passenger service to the area in 1961 and freight service in 1972. Subsequently, the Conway Scenic Railroad was established. Today, the line offers visitors a tour of the region, including Crawford Notch. The station is listed on the National Register of Historic Places.

In the late 1980s, the White Mountain Airport closed and was redeveloped as a large outlet mall called Settlers' Green Outlet Village. Continued growth through the 1990s and 2000s in North Conway and the villages nearby made Conway the most populous community in Carroll County. Traffic congestion led to an overhaul of the road system, including widening Route 16 through North Conway village and constructing a road parallel to Route 16 to allow traffic to move between Redstone and Intervale uninterrupted. A plan for a bypass of the area was developed but not implemented.

North Conway remains a popular destination due to its shopping, recreation, and attractions.

Recreation

North Conway and its surrounding towns offer hiking in the White Mountain National Forest. The area is a major rock climbing destination in the northeastern United States, particularly Cathedral Ledge in Echo Lake State Park. The  cliff overlooks Echo Lake and North Conway from the west. Unlike nearby White Horse Ledge, another rock climbing site, Cathedral Ledge has an automobile road to the summit, which provides fine views of the Saco River Valley.

In late September through early October, tourists arrive to see the autumn foliage on the surrounding mountains and forests. The Conway Scenic Railroad features train rides that leave from the village's Victorian station. In the winter, the village is the nighttime destination for skiers visiting the area resorts, including North Conway's own Cranmore Mountain as well as nearby Attitash Mountain Resort, Black Mountain and Wildcat Mountain.

North Conway is home to the Green Hills Preserve. The preserve encompasses several mountains in the Mt. Washington Valley, and is a low north-south running mountain ridge flanking the east side of Route 16. The preserve includes Rattlesnake Mountain, Middle Mountain, Peaked Mountain, and Black Cap mountain.

Geography
North Conway is located at  (44.051534, -71.122752), in the northern part of the town of Conway.

According to the United States Census Bureau, the North Conway census-designated place (CDP) includes the village of North Conway plus the Conway portion of the neighboring community of Kearsarge. The Saco River forms the western edge of the North Conway CDP.

Climate

Demographics

As of the census of 2010, there were 2,349 people, 1,105 households, and 547 families residing in the CDP. The population density was 546.3 people per square mile (211.9/km2). There were 1,804 housing units, of which 699, or 38.7%, were vacant. 551 of the vacant units were seasonal or vacation properties. The racial makeup of the CDP was 94.7% White, 0.5% African American, 0.4% Native American, 2.0% Asian, 0.1% Native Hawaiian or other Pacific Islander, 0.6% some other race, and 1.7% from two or more races. Hispanic or Latino of any race were 1.6% of the population.

There were 1,105 households, out of which 23.3% had children under the age of 18 living with them, 33.1% were headed by married couples living together, 11.4% had a female householder with no husband present, and 50.5% were non-families. 39.9% of all households were made up of individuals, and 12.8% were someone living alone who was 65 years of age or older. The average household size was 2.07, and the average family size was 2.73.

In the CDP, the population was spread out, with 18.6% under the age of 18, 8.4% from 18 to 24, 26.8% from 25 to 44, 29.1% from 45 to 64, and 16.8% who were 65 years of age or older. The median age was 42.1 years. For every 100 females, there were 99.9 males. For every 100 females age 18 and over, there were 92.5 males.

For the period 2007–11, the estimated median annual income for a household in the CDP was $40,804, and the median income for a family was $46,832. Male full-time workers had a median income of $31,764 versus $23,859 for females. The per capita income for the CDP was $21,664. About 12.1% of families and 21.9% of the population were below the poverty line.

Notable people 

 Ed Ashnault, college football and basketball coach; grew up in North Conway.
 Benjamin Champney, artist
 Gordon Clapp, actor
 E. E. Cummings, 20th century poet; summer resident; died (of a stroke) in North Conway, on September 3, 1962
 Jigger Johnson, logger
 Jeff Locke, Major League Baseball player, born in North Conway and raised in neighboring Redstone
 Helen Bigelow Merriman, 19th century artist and philanthropist born in North Conway; she helped found Memorial Hospital, and served as president of the public library
 Nathan W. Pease, photographer who lived and worked capturing images of area sites
 Carroll Reed, ski instructor and promoter of the sport. Founder of Carroll Reed Sportswear
 Johann "Hannes" Schneider, Austrian ski instructor of the first half of the twentieth century and founder of the Arlberg Technique for teaching skiing; ran ski school in North Conway
 John Shea, actor, producer and director
 David A. Shirley, chemist
 Leanne Smith, two-time Olympian and World Cup alpine ski racer
 Martha Pearson Smith (1836-?), poet, musician, temperance activist
 Julia Ruth Stevens, daughter of Babe Ruth

Sites of interest
 Echo Lake State Park
 Mount Washington Valley Children's Museum
 Mount Washington Valley Theatre Company
Cranmore Mountain

Sites on the National Register of Historic Places:
 North Conway 5 and 10 Cent Store
 Eastern Slope Inn
 Conway Scenic Railroad

See also

North Conway is a village within the town of Conway.  The other villages within Conway are:

 Conway village
 Center Conway
 East Conway
 Kearsarge
 Redstone
 White Mountain Airport (New Hampshire)

References

External links

 Town of Conway official website
 Conway Historical Society
 Conway Public Library
 The Conway Daily Sun, local newspaper
 Mount Washington Valley Chamber of Commerce & Visitors Bureau

 
Census-designated places in Carroll County, New Hampshire
Census-designated places in New Hampshire